The 2009 Maccabi Men's Challenger was a professional tennis tournament played on outdoor hard courts. It was part of the 2009 ATP Challenger Tour. It took place in Melbourne, Australia between 23 February and 1 March 2009.

Singles main-draw entrants

Seeds

 Rankings are as of 16 February 2009.

Other entrants
The following players received wildcards into the singles main draw:
  Dayne Kelly
  Dane Propoggia
  Matt Reid
  Bernard Tomic

The following players received entry from the qualifying draw:
  Sadik Kadir
  Tobias Klein
  Joel Lindner
  Xu Junchao

Champions

Men's singles

 Bernard Tomic def.  Marinko Matosevic, 5–7, 6–4, 6–3

Men's doubles

 Sanchai Ratiwatana /  Sonchat Ratiwatana def.  Chen Ti /  Danai Udomchoke, 7–6(5), 5–7, [10–7]

External links
Tennis Australia official website

Maccabi Men's Challenger
Mac